Jon Hodnemyr (born 4 December 1995) is a Norwegian football defender who currently plays for Vindbjart.

Career
He started his career in Vindbjart FK, and made his senior debut in 2010, only 14 years and 287 days of age. Ahead of the 2014 season he joined IK Start. He made his league debut in November 2014 against Vålerenga, playing the whole match.

References

Jon Hodnemyr vender hjem, vindbjart.no, 11 January 2016

1995 births
Living people
People from Vennesla
Norwegian footballers
Vindbjart FK players
IK Start players
Eliteserien players

Association football defenders
Sportspeople from Agder